C. S. Amsden (March 26, 1856 – August 6, 1943) was president pro tempore of the South Dakota Senate and speaker pro tempore of the South Dakota House of Representatives.

Biography
Amsden was born on March 26, 1856 in Janesville, Wisconsin. He attended Carleton College.

On January 5, 1881, Amsden married Lois L. Morton. They had two children before her death from tuberculosis on June 22, 1882. On July 3, 1884, he married Julia Smith. They had four children before her death on May 12, 1926. Amsden died on August 6, 1943 in Milbank, South Dakota.

Career
From 1885 to 1888, Amsden was Superintendent of Schools of Grant County, South Dakota. He was then twice a member of the Senate. First, from 1905 to 1906 and second from 1909 to 1928, serving as President pro tempore from 1915 to 1928. Later, Amsden was a member of the House of Representatives three times. First, from 1931 to 1932, serving as Speaker pro tempore in 1931. He was later a member again from 1935 to 1938 and from 1941 to 1942. Amsden was a Republican.

References

Politicians from Janesville, Wisconsin
People from Milbank, South Dakota
Republican Party South Dakota state senators
Republican Party members of the South Dakota House of Representatives
Carleton College alumni
1856 births
1943 deaths